Events in the year 2020 in the Democratic Republic of the Congo.

Incumbents
 President: Félix Tshisekedi 
 Prime Minister: Sylvestre Ilunga

Events
Ongoing since 2018 – Kivu Ebola epidemic
Ongoing since 2019 – 2019–2020 measles outbreak in the Democratic Republic of the Congo
10 March – First confirmed case of COVID-19 in the Democratic Republic of the Congo
March to May – Flooding in South Kivu Province led to the death of 44 people, 200 were injured, while 64,000 were made homeless.
 24 May - 20 September – A series of massacres took place, carried out mostly by Islamist rebel group Allied Democratic Forces.
 12 September – At least 50 people were killed in when landslides collapse three artisanal gold mines near Kamituga, South Kivu. Collapses killed 18 earlier this year in Maniema and Katanga.
20 October - Allied Democratic Forces (ADF) reportedly orchestrated a prison escape from the Kangbayi prison in Beni.
31 December – ADF rebels kill and in many cases behead 25 people in Tingwe, Beni.

Deaths

13 January – André Lufwa, sculptor (b. 1925).
28 January – Léon Mokuna, football player and manager (b. 1928).
15 April – Gérard Mulumba Kalemba, Roman Catholic prelate, Bishop of Mweka (b. 1937).
23 April – Jacques Kazadi, economist, professor, and politician (b. 1936).
28 May – Celine Fariala Mangaza, disability advocate (b. 1967).
2 June – Lugi Gizenga, politician (1965 births).
14 June – Pierre Lumbi, politician (b. 1950).
21 June – John Bompengo, 52, journalist (Associated Press); COVID-19
25 June 
Emeka Mamale, footballer (b. 1977).
Kilasu Massamba, footballer (b. 1950).
29 October – Sindika Dokolo, 48, art collector and businessman.
1 December – Jean-Pierre Lola Kisanga, 51, politician.

See also
COVID-19 pandemic in the Democratic Republic of the Congo
2020 in Middle Africa

References

 
2020s in the Democratic Republic of the Congo 
Years of the 21st century in the Democratic Republic of the Congo 
Democratic Republic of the Congo 
Democratic Republic of the Congo